In chemistry, work-up refers to the series of manipulations required to isolate and purify the product(s) of a chemical reaction.

Typically, these manipulations may include:
 quenching a reaction to deactivate any unreacted reagents.
 cooling the reaction mixture or adding an antisolvent to induce precipitation, and collecting or removing the solids by filtration, decantation, or centrifugation
 removal of solvents by evaporation
 separating the reaction mixture into organic and aqueous layers by liquid-liquid extraction
 purification by chromatography, distillation or recrystallization

For example, the Grignard reaction between phenylmagnesium bromide and carbon dioxide in the form of dry ice gives the conjugate base of benzoic acid. The desired product, benzoic acid, is obtained by the following work-up:

The reaction mixture containing the Grignard reagent is allowed to warm to room temperature in a water bath to allow excess dry ice to evaporate
Any remaining Grignard reagent is quenched by the addition of water
Dilute hydrochloric acid is added to the reaction mixture to protonate the benzoate salts, as well as to dissolve the magnesium salts. White solids of impure benzoic acid are obtained.
The benzoic acid is decanted to remove the aqueous solution of impurities, more water is added, and the mixture is brought to a boil with more water added to give a homogeneous solution.
The solution is allowed to cool slowly to room temperature, then in an ice bath to recrystallize benzoic acid.
The recrystallized benzoic acid crystals are collected on a Buchner funnel and are allowed to air-dry to give pure benzoic acid.

See also
 Flow chemistry

References

Chemical reactions